St. Thomas the Apostle is a Roman Catholic church in Norwalk, Connecticut, part of the Diocese of Bridgeport. The Parish of St. Thomas the Apostle was established in 1935.

Buildings
The present church built in the late 1940s. The architect was Edward F. Allodi of Cape Cod, Massachusetts, a graduate of the Columbia University School of Architecture. Allodi's Romanesque Revival building is remarkable for its time period as appears as though it could have been built 20 years earlier.

History
In 2010 the Reverend Robert J. Crofut received the second annual John Swanhaus Award from the Order of Malta in an event hosted by Charles Grodin.

References

External links 
  St. Thomas the Apostle - website
 Diocese of Bridgeport

20th-century Roman Catholic church buildings in the United States
Romanesque Revival church buildings in Connecticut
Christian organizations established in 1935
Roman Catholic churches in Norwalk, Connecticut